A dargah ( dargâh or  dargah, Turkish: dergâh, Hindustani: dargah दरगाह درگاہ,  dorgah) is a shrine or tomb built over the grave of a revered religious figure, often a Sufi saint or dervish. Sufis often visit the shrine for ziyarat, a term associated with religious visits and "pilgrimages". Dargahs are often associated with Sufi eating and meeting rooms and hostels, called khanqah or hospices. They usually include a mosque, meeting rooms, Islamic religious schools (madrassas), residences for a teacher or caretaker, hospitals, and other buildings for community purposes.

The same structure, carrying the same social meanings and sites of the same kinds of ritual practices, is called maqam in the Arabic-speaking world.

Dargah today is considered to be place where saints prayed and mediated (their spiritual residence). Shrine is modern day building which encompasses of actual dargah as well but not always.

Etymology 
Dargah is derived from a Persian word which literally means "portal" or "threshold." The Persian word is a composite of "dar (در)"  meaning "door, gate" and "gah (گاه)" meaning "place". It may have a connection or connotation with the Arabic word "darajah (دَرَجَة)" meaning "stature, prestige, dignity, order, place" or may also mean "status, position, rank, echelon, class"
Some Sufi and other Muslims believe that dargahs are portals by which they can invoke the deceased saint's intercession and blessing (as per tawassul, also known as dawat-e qaboor[Persian: da‘wat-i qabũrدعوتِ قبور, "invocations of the graves or tombs"] or ‘ilm-e dawat [Persian: ‘ilm-i da‘wat عِلمِ دعوت, "knowledge of invocations"]). Still others hold a less important view of dargahs, and simply visit as a means of paying their respects to deceased pious individuals or to pray at the sites for perceived spiritual benefits.

However, dargah is originally a core concept in Islamic Sufism and holds great importance for the followers of Sufi saints. Many Muslims believe their wishes are fulfilled after they offer prayer or service at a dargah of the saint they follow. Devotees tie threads of mannat (Persian: منّت, "grace, favour, praise") at dargahs and contribute for langar and pray at dargahs. Dargahs dotted the landscape of Punjab even before the partition of the Indian subcontinent.

Over time, musical offerings of dervishes and sheikhs in the presence of the devout at these shrines, usually impromptu or on the occasion of Urs, gave rise to musical genres like Qawwali and Kafi, wherein Sufi poetry is accompanied by music and sung as an offering to a murshid, a type of Sufi spiritual instructor. Today they have become a popular form of music and entertainment throughout South Asia, with exponents like Nusrat Fateh Ali Khan and Abida Parveen taking their music to various parts of the world.

Throughout the non-Arab Muslim world 

Sufi shrines are found in many Muslim communities throughout the world and are called by many names. The term dargah is common in the Persian-influenced Islamic world, notably in Iran, Turkey and South Asia.

In South Africa, the term is used to describe shrines in the Durban area where there is a strong Indian presence, while the term keramat is more commonly used in Cape Town, where there is a strong Cape Malay culture.

In South Asia, dargahs are often the site of festivals (milad) held in honor of the deceased saint on his passing away anniversary (urs). The shrine is illuminated with candles or strings of electric lights at this time.  Dargahs in South Asia, have historically been a place for all faiths since the medieval times; for example, the Ajmer Sharif Dargah was meeting place for Hindus and Muslims to pay respect and even to the revered Saint Mu'in al-Din Chishti.

In China, the term gongbei is usually used for shrine complexes centered around a Sufi saint's tomb.

Worldwide
There are many active dargahs open to the public worldwide where aspirants may go for a retreat. The following is a list of dargahs open to the public.
 Raje Bagsavar Dargah, Khatgun, Satara, India
 Shrine of Abdul Qadir Jilani in Baghdad, Iraq
 Shrine of Lal Shahbaz Qalandar in Sehwan Sharif, Pakistan
 Shrine of Pir Hadi Hassan Bux Shah Jilani in Duthro Sharif, Pakistan
 Shrine of Baba Bulleh Shah in Kasur, Pakistan
 Shrine of Murshid Nadir Ali Shah in Sehwan Sharif, Pakistan
 Data Darbar in Lahore, Pakistan
 Shah Jalal Dargah in Sylhet, Bangladesh
 Ajmer Sharif Dargah of Moinuddin Chishti, Ajmer, Rajasthan, India
 Shrine of Ashraf Jahangir Semnani at Ashrafpur Kichhauchha, Uttar Pradesh, India
 Dargah of Shah Ata in Gangarampur, West Bengal, India
 Erwadi, Tamil Nadu, India
 Nagore, Tamil Nadu, India
 Thiruparankundram Dargah, Tamil Nadu, India
 Humaithara, Egypt
 Madurai Hazrat Maqbara, Madurai, Tamil Nadu, India
 Sheikh Nazim Al-Haqqani in Lefka, Cyprus

Opposition by other Sunni groups
The Ahl-i Hadith, Deobandi, Salafi and Wahhabi religious scholars argue against the practice of constructing shrines over graves, and consider it as associating partners with God or shirk. The Islamic prophet Muhammad strongly condemned the practice of turning graves into places of worship and even cursed those who did so. The current Wahhabi rulers of Saudi Arabia have destroyed more than 1400-year-old grave sites of companions and ahl al-bayt including Othman, Khadija and Aisha amongst numerous others, although visiting graves is encouraged in Islam to remember death and the Day of Judgment.

See also

 Datuk Keramat
 Khanqah
 Maqam
 Maqbara
 Marabout
 Mazar
 Ziyarat

Bibliography 
 Ernst, Carl W. The Spirituality of the Sufi Shrine – Chapter9, The Wiley Blackwell Companion to Islamic Spirituality, 2022. pp. 165–179.

References

 
Islamic architecture
Islam in Pakistan
Islam in India
Islam in Bangladesh
Islam in Turkey
Persian words and phrases